Crystal River Tourist Camp (formerly Crystal River Cave Court, today Cave Courts Motel) is a motor inn built in 1932 in Cave City, Arkansas. It is the oldest operating motor court in the state. It is built of fieldstones from the Ozarks.

History
Prince Matlock built the motel in 1932 by setting thousands of rocks from the area. He used geodes and quartz as decorative rocks and created many designs of crosses and animals to add to the rock walls. Underneath the motel is a large cave for which Cave City is named. The subterranean Crystal River runs through the cave's five chambers.

Today
The motel was abandoned for several years before being purchased and restored. It is now reopened as the Cave Courts Motel.

See also
 List of motels
 National Register of Historic Places listings in Sharp County, Arkansas

References

Buildings and structures in Sharp County, Arkansas
Tourist attractions in Sharp County, Arkansas
Hotel buildings on the National Register of Historic Places in Arkansas
Motels in the United States
Historic districts on the National Register of Historic Places in Arkansas
National Register of Historic Places in Sharp County, Arkansas